Canadian Tire money, officially Canadian Tire 'money' or CTM, is a loyalty program operated by the Canadian retail chain Canadian Tire Corporation (CTC). It consists of both paper coupons introduced in 1958 and used in Canadian Tire stores as scrip, and since 2012 in a digital form introduced as Canadian Tire Money Advantage, rebranded in 2018 as Triangle Rewards. Both forms of the loyalty program remain current as of December 2022. Canadian Tire Money has been noted as the most successful loyalty program in Canadian retail history. 

Canadian Tire Money is denominated in Canadian dollars. It is earned based on the pre-tax amount of a purchase, excluding labour and shop supplies costs. The initial rate earned was 5% of the eligible purchase price, but it was lowered to 3%, then to 1.4% and now is 0.4%.

When used to pay for merchandise, CTM is considered to be a cash equivalent and may be used to pay for any part of a purchase, including sales taxes. CTM cannot be exchanged for real Canadian currency.

Paper Canadian Tire money coupons

Paper CTM coupons resemble real banknotes. The notes are printed on paper similar to what Canadian currency was printed on when they were still paper, and were jointly produced by two of the country's long-established security printers, British American Banknote Company (BABN) and Canadian Bank Note Company (CBN). Paper CTM can be earned and redeemed only at Canadian Tire stores, although some other private businesses may choose to accept it as payment.

Paper CTM is earned only when customers pay with cash, debit cards, or Canadian Tire money. No paper CTM is earned on purchases made by credit card.

History

Canadian Tire Money coupons were introduced in 1958 at CTC's gas bar located at Yonge and Davenport streets in Toronto. They were inspired by Muriel Billes, the wife of Canadian Tire's co-founder and first president, Alfred J. Billes, as a response to the promotional giveaways that many gas companies offered at the time. It was only available at Canadian Tire gas bars but was so successful that, in 1961, it was extended to the retail stores as well. The print on the 'notes' refers to them as "money bonus coupons". Until 1992, there were separate issues of coupons redeemable either at Canadian Tire gas bars, or Canadian Tire retail stores.

From the launch of the program until 1994, CTM was issued and redeemable only at select Canadian Tire locations in Southern Ontario. The program was expanded to all Canadian Tire retail locations across Canada in 1995.

Since 1961, the coupons have featured an engraving of "Sandy McTire", who sports a tam o' shanter and a stylized waxed moustache. A fictional character based on no specific individual, he is assumed to represent a thrifty Scotsman, the 1950s everyman of blue-collar Canada.

Denominations
CTM coupons are currently produced in denominations of 5, 10, 25, and 50 cents, as well as one and two dollars.

Usage beyond Canadian Tire

 In late 2004 in Moncton, New Brunswick, several customers at a Canadian Imperial Bank of Commerce ATM were dispensed a total of 11 bills of Canadian Tire money instead of real bills. They were compensated by the bank.
 Culturally, Canadian Tire money is sometimes referred to by comedians: perhaps as a national version of "Monopoly money", perhaps invoking a pejorative comparison of the value of Canadian dollars against U.S. dollars, or perhaps as a misunderstood exotic element of Canadian society (e.g. Ron James's comedic reference to the person depicted on the bill as "our king"). In the 2009 Trailer Park Boys movie Countdown to Liquor Day, Jim Lahey offers Julian $700 in Canadian Tire money for his trailer.
 In the mid-1990s, a man in Germany was caught with up to $11 million in counterfeit Canadian Tire money. It was recovered before he left for Canada to redeem it.
 In 2012, musician Corin Raymond funded his album Paper Nickels partially through a fundraising campaign inviting fans to donate their unused Canadian Tire money.

Coins

On December 2, 2009, as part of an advertised deal, Canadian Tire had handed out the first Canadian Tire coin, redeemable with the purchase of at least  of merchandise. Another similar deal followed in 2010 (coinciding with the 2010 Olympic Winter Games), with a three-coin winter collection. The coins can be spent in the same manner as conventional CTM.

Electronic Canadian Tire money

A digital version of Canadian Tire Money was introduced in 2012 as Canadian Tire Money Advantage, which was earned by presenting a loyalty card. This was expanded in 2014 to holders of the Options credit card issued by Canadian Tire Financial Services (CTFS).

In April 2018, Canadian Tire Money Advantage program was replaced with the Triangle Rewards loyalty program for the earning of digital Canadian Tire Money ("eCTM"). The Triangle Rewards program expanded the earning and redemption of eCTM from Canadian Tire stores to the rest of Canadian Tire Corporation's family of stores, including Mark's, Sport Chek,  Sports Experts, PartSource, and the Canadian operations of Party City.

Unlike with paper Canadian Tire money, eCTM can be earned on purchases paid for with a credit card. Extra eCTMs is earned when paying with a Triangle credit card issued by CTFS.

See also

Canadian Tire Bank
Loyalty program
Numismatics
Banknote

References

External links
 Canadian Tire 'Money' - Select 1958 expand dash symbol — History, on the Canadian Tire website.

Money
Customer loyalty programs in Canada
Currencies of Canada
Local currencies of Canada
Private currencies
Canadiana